Pacific City State Airport  is a public use airport located one nautical mile (2 km) south of the central business district of Pacific City, in Tillamook County, Oregon, United States. It is owned by the Oregon Department of Aviation.

Facilities and aircraft 
Pacific City State Airport covers an area of 15 acres (6 ha) at an elevation of 5 feet (2 m) above mean sea level. It has one runway designated 14/32 with an asphalt surface measuring 1,875 by 30 feet (572 x 9 m).

For the 12-month period ending November 4, 2011, the airport had 2,000 aircraft operations, an average of 166 per month: 96% general aviation and 4% air taxi. At that time there were five aircraft based at this airport, all single-engine.

References

External links 
 Pacific City Airport
 Friends of Pacific City State Airport
 Aerial image as of May 1994 from USGS The National Map
 

Airports in Tillamook County, Oregon